FC Chiasso is a Swiss football club based in Chiasso. It was founded in 1905. Chiasso also played in the Italian first league between 1914 and 1923.

Between 1927 and 1993, the club played a total of 28 seasons in the Swiss top flight. The team came second in the 1950–51 season and third the following season. It also reached three times the Semi-final of the Swiss Cup. 

The public limited company FC Chiasso 2005 SA was declared bankrupt in January 2023. The youth department was not affected by this as they were organised under the umbralla of the club FC Chiasso. But the first team which had been in the race for promotion to Challenge League was excluded from Promotion League mid-season. The scores of the games already played were put to 0:0, 0 points.

Current squad

Out on loan

Former players

  Matteo Nevicati

Famous coaches
 Attilio Lombardo (2006–07)
 Ryszard Komornicki (2013)
 Gianluca Zambrotta (2013–15)
 Stefano Maccoppi (2019)
 Alessandro Lupi (2019–)

References

External links
Official website—

 
Football clubs in Switzerland
FC Chiasso
FC Chiasso
Italian football First Division clubs
Association football clubs established in 1905
FC Chiasso
Former Italian football clubs